Sara Stevanoska (born August 28, 1993) is a Macedonian handball player for Turkish club Zağnos SK and the Macedonian national team.

She was with RK Vardar in her country and ZORK Jagodina in Serbia before she transferred in July 2015 to the Genç Uşak SK to play in the Turkish Women's Handball Super League, and then in December 2015 to the Trabzon-based Zağnos SK.

She took part at the 2012–13 Women's EHF Cup as well as Women's EHF Cup Winners' Cup of 2013–14 and 2014–15.

References

1993 births
Sportspeople from Prilep
Macedonian female handball players
Macedonian expatriate sportspeople in Serbia
Macedonian expatriate sportspeople in Turkey
Expatriate handball players in Turkey
Zağnos SK (women's handball) players
Living people